Back and Forth Series Two is a compilation album by industrial band Skinny Puppy. It consists of the entire Back and Forth release remixed from the original four-track tapes, including raw live recordings and studio rarities.

Track listing 

There is an untitled improvisational piece that appears before "Smothered Hope (demo)", and lasts just over two minutes long.

Personnel 
cEvin Key - keyboard, drumbox, tape, voice. Nivek Ogre - voice, lyrik. Guitar on K-9 by Greg Monk (uncredited).

References

External links 
 Back and Forth Series Two at Discogs (CD, Nettwerk)
 Back and Forth Series Two (Metal Box) at Discogs (CD, Nettwerk)
 [ Back and Forth Series Two] at Allmusic

1992 compilation albums
Skinny Puppy compilation albums
Nettwerk Records compilation albums